Ornithurae (meaning "bird tails" in Greek) is a natural group which includes the common ancestor of Ichthyornis, Hesperornis, and all modern birds as well as all other descendants of that common ancestor.

Classification
Ernst Haeckel coined the name in 1866 and included in the group all "true birds" with the "characteristic tail morphology of all extant birds" (translation by Jacques Gauthier). This distinguishes the group from Archaeopteryx, which Haeckel placed in another new group called Sauriurae. Said simply, modern birds have short, fused pygostyle tails, while Archaeopteryx retained the long tail characteristic of non-avian theropod dinosaurs.

Gauthier converted Ornithurae into a clade, giving it a branch-based definition: "extant birds and all other taxa, such as Ichthyornis and Hesperornithes, that are closer to extant birds than is Archaeopteryx". Later he and de Queiroz redefined it as an apomorphy-based clade more in keeping with Haeckel's original usage, including the first pan-avian with a "bird tail" homologous with that of Vultur gryphus, and all of its descendants. They defined "bird tail" as a tail that is shorter than the femur, with a pygostyle that is a ploughshare-shaped, compressed element, with the bones fused in the adult, composed of less than six caudal vertebrae, and shorter than the free part of the tail, which itself is composed of less than eight caudal vertebrae. They included Aves (which they defined as the "crown group" of modern birds), Ichthyornis, Hesperornithes, and Apsaravis in Ornithurae.

Neornithes was originally proposed as a replacement for Ornithurae by Gadow in 1892 and 1893. Gauthier and de Queiroz, therefore, consider Neornithes a junior synonym of Ornithurae, though many other scientists use Neornithes to refer to the much more restrictive crown group consisting only of modern birds (a group for which Gauthier uses the name Aves). Alternately, some researchers have used Ornithurae to refer to a more restrictive node-based clade, anchored on Hesperornis and modern birds.

Relationships
The cladogram below is the result of a 2017 analysis by McLachlan and colleagues.

References

 
Taxa named by Ernst Haeckel